"Jeannine, I Dream of Lilac Time" is a 1928 song composed by Nathaniel Shilkret with lyrics by L. Wolfe Gilbert. It is the theme song of the motion picture Lilac Time, starring Gary Cooper and Colleen Moore. The song sold almost two million copies of sheet music and was recorded by over a hundred top artists, including Louis Armstrong, Erroll Garner, Skitch Henderson, Guy Lombardo, The London Philharmonic Orchestra, John McCormack, Mitch Miller, Hugo Montenegro, The Platters, and Lawrence Welk.

The version by Gene Austin was released on September 7, 1928, and rose to number 1 for five weeks.

It is part of the soundtrack of the 1962 motion picture Tender Is the Night and was used in an episode of the television series Miss Marple.

References

External links
 "Jeannine, I Dream of Lilac Time" at Discogs website

1928 songs
Songs written by L. Wolfe Gilbert
Songs written by Nathaniel Shilkret